Wade Mathew Noonan (born 7 April 1971) is an Australian politician. He was a Labor Party member of the Victorian Legislative Assembly from 2007 to 2018, representing the electorate of Williamstown. He was a minister in the Andrews Ministry from December 2014; initially as Minister for Police and Minister for Corrections (2014–2016), and from May 2016 as Minister for Industry and Employment and Minister for Resources.

Noonan studied at Parade College and the Swinburne University of Technology. He worked as a travel manager for STA Travel from 1990 to 1996, before becoming involved in the union movement. He worked as an organiser for the Shop, Distributive and Allied Employees Association from 1996 to 2002, before shifting to the Transport Workers Union of Australia, where he became federal assistant secretary and federal organising and training officer. He remained in this role until his election to parliament. Noonan's father, Bill Noonan, is a long-time TWU official and Victorian state secretary.

In July 2007, Steve Bracks, the then Premier of Victoria and member for the safe Labor seat of Williamstown, suddenly announced his intention to retire from politics. Noonan emerged as an early favourite to win Labor preselection for the resulting by-election, and won the nomination after a deal to install television presenter Angela Pippos in the seat fell through. He was elected on 15 September 2007, defeating Greens candidate, former City of Maribyrnong mayor and future Senator Janet Rice.

On 8 February 2016, Noonan announced he would be taking a three-month leave of absence from his ministerial and parliamentary positions to undergo counselling due to exposure to traumatic incidents in his work as police minister. In May 2016, he shifted ministries as a result, changing to Minister for Industry and Employment and Minister for Resources. On 4 October 2017, Noonan announced he was resigning from cabinet and would retire from politics at the next election. He resigned on 15 October 2017. Post politics, Noonan was appointed the Executive Director of the West of Melbourne Economic Development Alliance (WoMEDA) from 2018 to 2021, and then Deputy Vice-Chancellor, External Relations and Partnerships at Victoria University from 2021.

References

External links
 Parliamentary voting record of Wade Noonan at Victorian Parliament Tracker

1971 births
Living people
Members of the Victorian Legislative Assembly
Australian Labor Party members of the Parliament of Victoria
Australian trade unionists
Swinburne University of Technology alumni
21st-century Australian politicians